Madar Bux (1907January 20, 1967) was a Bengali politician in East Pakistan. He was a member of the East Bengal Legislative Assembly from 1947 to 1954 for Rajshahi district.

References

External links
 Biography from own district webpage.

Pakistani politicians
1907 births
1967 deaths